Obruk may refer to the following places in Turkey:

Obruk, Bor
Obruk, Kastamonu
Obruk Dam